Portas is a municipality in Galicia, Spain in the province of Pontevedra.

Parroquias 

It is made up of four parroquias (parishes):

 Briallos (San Cristóbal)
 Lantaño (San Pedro)
 Portas (Santa María)
 Romay (San Julián), home to the Romay fortress in Tras do Rio, an ancestral seat of the House of Romay.

References

Municipalities in the Province of Pontevedra